William Troy Herriage (December 20, 1930 – January 21, 2012) was an American pitcher in Major League Baseball who played for the Kansas City Athletics during the  season. Nicknamed "Dutch," he was listed at  (1.85 m), 170 lb. (77 kg).

Herriage was born in Tipton, Oklahoma. He grew up in California, attending Oakdale High School in the San Joaquin Valley.

Herriage played in the Philadelphia Phillies and Boston Red Sox minor league systems in 1951–52 before joining military service during Korean War. Following discharge in 1954, he played two years in the minors and was selected in the 1955 Rule 5 draft by the Kansas City Athletics.

Herriage formed part of a 1956 Kansas City pitching rotation that included Wally Burnette, Art Ditmar, Lou Kretlow and Alex Kellner. The Athletics squad finished last in the then eight team American League, with a 52–102 mark, 45 games out of first place. Herriage posted a 1–13 record and a 6.64 earned run average in 31 games (16 starts), allowing 83 runs (76 earned) on 135 hits, while striking out 59 and walking 64 batters in 103 innings of work. In his one MLB victory, on May 22, 1956, he threw a complete game and defeated the Washington Senators, 6–1, allowing only three singles.

After 1956, Herriage returned to the minor leagues for two more years. He went 55–55 with a 3.61 ERA for seven teams in parts of 11 minor league seasons spanning 1951–1958.
 
Following baseball, Herriage enjoyed a long career as a design engineer and later developed a second career as a bed and breakfast owner. He was a longtime resident of Atlanta, where he died at the age of 81.

References

External links

1930 births
2012 deaths
Albany Senators players
American military personnel of the Korean War
Baseball players from Atlanta
Baseball players from Oklahoma
Kansas City Athletics players
Klamath Falls Gems players
Little Rock Travelers players
Magic Valley Cowboys players
Major League Baseball pitchers
Montgomery Rebels players
People from Oakdale, California
Sacramento Solons players
San Jose Red Sox players